Foto Showdown, known in Japan as , is a turn-based video game made exclusively for the Nintendo DSi. It was released in Japan on November 19, 2009 and in North America on March 9, 2010. The game revolves around players using their monsters to battle against rivals. By winning tournaments and battles, players can advance through the game through upgrades and unlocking more powerful items. The game allows player to take advantage of the DSi outer camera by allowing them to spawn certain monsters for use in battle based on the dominant colors in the photo.

Reception 

The reviews for the game were mixed. Josh_Laddin from Game Revolution called "Foto Showdown feels like a tech demo for the DSi that doesn't show off any tech.". However, Adam Brown from Cheat Code Central made a positive review about the game saying "Although collecting monsters with the camera can be confusing and tedious, the battle system is rather good. Being able to fight and trade monsters with a friend wirelessly is also a welcome addition."

References

 http://www.gamezone.com/reviews/foto_showdown_review
 http://www.gamerevolution.com/review/foto-showdown (?)
 http://www.metacritic.com/game/ds/foto-showdown
 http://www.cheatcc.com/ds/rev/fotoshowdownreview.html

External links
 
Official Konami webpage for Foto Showdown

Nintendo DS-only games
Nintendo DS games
Nintendo DSi games
Konami games
Turn-based strategy video games
Multiplayer and single-player video games
2009 video games
Video games developed in Japan